These are the results of the 2006 IAAF World Cup, which took place in Athens, Greece on 16 and 17 September.

Five continental teams were present (Africa, America, Asia, Europe, and Oceania) and three full national teams competed (United States, Russia and host nation Greece). Furthermore – following victories at the 2006 European Cup on the men's and women's sides respectively – France fielded a men's team, while Poland fielded a women's team.

Track

100 m

Men

Women

200 m

Men

Women

400 m

Men

Women

800 m

Men

Women

1500 m

Men

Women

3000 m

Men

Women

5000 m

Men

Women

3000 m steeplechase

Men

Women

100/110 m hurdles

Men (110 m)

Women (100 m)

400 m hurdles

Men

Women

4 × 100 m relay

Men

Women

4 × 400 m relay

Men

Women

Field

High jump

Men

Women

Pole vault

Men

Women

Long jump

Men

Women

Triple jump

Men

Women

Shot put

Men

Women

Discus

Men

Women

Hammer

Men

Women

Javelin

Men

Women

References

Competition results
Results by Event. IAAF. Retrieved on 2010-09-04.

External links
Official IAAF competition website

IAAF World Cup results
Events at the IAAF Continental Cups